Oroville City Elementary School District is a public school district in Butte County, California, United States.

The district consists of eight schools: Sierra Del Oro Preschool for Special Needs Students; five elementary schools: Bird Street Elementary School, Oakdale Heights Elementary School, Ophir Elementary School, Stanford Avenue Elementary School, and Wyandotte Academy; and two middle schools/junior high schools: Central Middle School and Ishi Hills Middle School.

References

External links
 

School districts in California